Mecyna trinalis is a species of moth in the family Crambidae. It is found in France, Spain, Italy, Austria, the Czech Republic, Slovakia, Poland, Hungary, the Balkan Peninsula, Ukraine, Russia, Turkey and North Africa, including Algeria and Morocco.

The wingspan is about 23-27 mm.

The larvae feed on Helianthemum species.

References

Moths described in 1775
Spilomelinae
Moths of Europe
Moths of Asia